Reinhold Trampler (26 July 1877 – 21 December 1964) was an Austrian fencer who competed in the 1912 Summer Olympics. He was part of the Austrian sabre team, which won the silver medal. In the individual foil event he was eliminated in the first round.

References

External links
profile

1877 births
1964 deaths
Austrian male foil fencers
Austrian male sabre fencers
Olympic fencers of Austria
Fencers at the 1912 Summer Olympics
Olympic silver medalists for Austria
Olympic medalists in fencing
Medalists at the 1912 Summer Olympics